Dignala is a census town in the Andal CD block in the Durgapur subdivision of the Paschim Bardhaman district in the state of West Bengal, India.

Geography

Location

Urbanisation
According to the 2011 census, 79.22% of the population of the Durgapur subdivision was urban and 20.78% was rural. The Durgapur subdivision has 1 municipal corporation at Durgapur and 38 (+1 partly) census towns  (partly presented in the map alongside; all places marked on the map are linked in the full-screen map).

Andal, a part of Andal (gram), Dignala, Palashban and Baska lying south of National Highway 19 (old numbering NH 2)/ Grand Trunk Road form a cluster of census towns. This cluster is linked to a cluster of census towns located north of NH 19.

Demographics
According to the 2011 Census of India, Dignala had a total population of 13,633, of which 7,170 (53%) were males and 6,463 (47%) were females. Population in the age range 0–6 years was 1,317. The total number of literate persons in Dignala was 10,797 (87.67% of the population over 6 years).

*For language details see Andal (community development block)#Language and religion

 India census, Dignala had a population of 12,510. Males constitute 54% of the population and females 46%. Dignala has an average literacy rate of 78%, higher than the national average of 59.5%: male literacy is 85% and, female literacy is 70%. In Dignala, 9% of the population is under 6 years of age.

Infrastructure

According to the District Census Handbook 2011, Bardhaman, Dignala covered an area of 3.64 km2. Among the civic amenities, it had 12 km roads, the protected water-supply involved overhead tank, tube well, borewell. It had 472 domestic electric connections and 45 road lighting (points). Among the medical facilities, it had 1 hospital, 1 dispensary/health centre, 1 nursing home. Among the educational facilities it had were 6 primary schools, 1 secondary school, 1 senior secondary school. It had 1 recognised shorthand, typewriting and vocational training institution. Among the important commodities it produced were earthen pots, well rings. It had the branch offices of 4 nationalised banks.

Education
Dignala has five primary and two higher secondary schools.

References

Cities and towns in Paschim Bardhaman district